Blender is a municipality in the district of Verden, in Lower Saxony, Germany.

References

Verden (district)